Brighton is a town in Marathon County, Wisconsin, United States. It is part of the Wausau, Wisconsin Metropolitan Statistical Area. The population was 620 at the 2020 census.

Geography
According to the United States Census Bureau, the town has a total area of 34.2 square miles (88.7 km2), of which 34.2 square miles (88.6 km2) is land and 0.04 square miles (0.1 km2), or 0.06%, is water.

Demographics
At the 2000 census, there were 611 people, 197 households and 159 families residing in the town. The population density was 17.9 per square mile (6.9/km2). There were 205 housing units at an average density of 6.0 per square mile (2.3/km2). The racial makeup of the town was 96.89% White, 2.29% Asian, 0.16% from other races, and 0.65% from two or more races. Hispanic or Latino of any race were 0.82% of the population.

There were 197 households, of which 44.2% had children under the age of 18 living with them, 73.6% were married couples living together, 4.1% had a female householder with no husband present, and 18.8% were non-families. 13.7% of all households were made up of individuals, and 2.0% had someone living alone who was 65 years of age or older. The average household size was 3.10 and the average family size was 3.46.

32.7% of the population were under the age of 18, 9.0% from 18 to 24, 30.8% from 25 to 44, 19.3% from 45 to 64, and 8.2% who were 65 years of age or older. The median age was 32 years. For every 100 females, there were 105.7 males. For every 100 females age 18 and over, there were 122.2 males.

The median household income was $38,304 and the median family income was $41,875. Males had a median income of $26,333 and female $23,281. The per capita income was $14,710. About 7.6% of families and 9.5% of the population were below the poverty line, including 11.8% of those under age 18 and 13.6% of those age 65 or over.

Notable people

 William McNeight, Wisconsin farmer and legislator, was born in the town

References

Towns in Marathon County, Wisconsin
Towns in Wisconsin